The Israel Bike Trail is a trail for mountain bikers in Israel. When complete, the trail will extend over 1,200 kilometers across Israel, like the Israel National Trail, from Eilat to Mount Hermon. It will be composed of 27 segments, passing through Jerusalem, Tel Aviv, and the Golan Heights.

In December 2011, the Jewish National Fund opened a  32 kilometer dual-path bike trail that passes through the western portion of the Ben Shemen Forest and continues on through the Modi’in area. In December 2014, eight sections, spanning 400 km from Mitzpe Ramon to Eilat, were open for riding across the Negev desert.

See also
Israel Cycling Federation
Hiking in Israel
Kerem Tunnel

References

Cycling in Israel
Tourism in Israel